Nazarali Issa (born 19 November 1990 in Comoros) is a Comorian footballer.

Career

Mauritius

Achieving a transfer to Cercle de Joachim SC prior to spring 2013, Issa contributed a hat-trick as the Curepipiens eliminated AS Port-Louis 2000 from the 2013 Mauritian Cup.

Reunion

Putting four past AS 12ème Km at the 2016-17 Coupe de France with SS Capricorne, the Comorian stated that the style in Mauritius was less technical compared to Reunion. Pulling off a deal with Trois-Bassins a year later, he chalked up three goals in his first two fixtures, including a double to fell AS Saint-Louisienne 2-0 before bring up his tally to four in as many rounds. However, he picked dup an injury as November 2017 got underway.

International goals
Scores and results list the Comoros' goal tally first.

Personal life

His father dying on the 29th of July 2014, Comorian sports media blog eliedjouma.centerblog.net offered their commiserations to him as well as his family.

References

External links 
 ISSA NAZARALI RAMADHANI, consacré pour la deuxième fois en 2015, meilleur joueur du championnat de l’Ile Maurice
 Issa Nazarali : Ne mérite t-il pas sa place en équipe nationale ?
 Nazarali fait la différence
 at National-Football-Teams

Comorian expatriate footballers
Comoros international footballers
Living people
Cercle de Joachim SC players
Comorian footballers
Expatriate footballers in Mauritius
1990 births
Association football forwards
Expatriate footballers in Réunion
Comorian expatriate sportspeople in Mauritius
Comorian expatriate sportspeople in Réunion